Franklin's bumblebee (Bombus franklini) is known to be one of the most narrowly distributed bumblebee species, making it a critically endangered bee of the western United States. It is known only from a  area in southern Oregon and northern California, between the Coast and Sierra-Cascade mountain ranges. It was last seen in 2006. Franklin's bumblebee is known to collect nectar and pollen from several wildflowers, such as lupine, California poppy, and horsemint, which causes it to be classified as a generalist forager.

Description

Franklin's bumblebee is distinguished from other bumblebees by a solid black abdomen, with yellow anteriorly on the thorax in a U-shaped pattern.  Females have black hair on their faces and the vertices, with some light hairs mixed above and below their antennal bases, while most similar bumblebee species have yellow. Males of this species are similar except their malar spaces are as long as wide, the hair on males' faces is yellow, and tergum 6 has some pale hairs laterally.

Conservation
The population of this bumblebee species has decreased drastically since 1998, with last sighting in Oregon, in 2006. Some sources say this species is already extinct, but until more concrete evidence is shown, it has been assigned a conservation status rank of G1, which is critically imperiled.

A petition was submitted by the Xerces society, Defenders of Wildlife, and the Center for Food Safety to the California Fish and Game Commission in October 2018 to list Bombus franklini and three others as endangered under the California Endangered Species Act.

The California Department of Fish and Wildlife evaluated this petition in a report for the California Fish and Game Commission completed in April 2019. On June 12, 2019 the California Fish and Game Commission voted to add all four bumblebees, including Bombus franklini, to the list of protected species under the California Endangered Species Act. A subsequent legal challenge of the CESA's definition of a fish as "a wild fish, mollusk, crustacean, invertebrate, amphibian, or part, spawn, or ovum of any of those animals" was eventually overruled, because the explicit intent was for all invertebrates (therefore including insects) to be qualified for protection under this legal definition.

References

External links

Bumblebees
Hymenoptera of North America
Endemic fauna of the United States
Insects of the United States
Fauna of California
Natural history of Oregon
Critically endangered fauna of the United States
Critically endangered fauna of California

Insects described in 1921